Nien Nunb is a fictional character in the Star Wars franchise. Introduced in the 1983 film Return of the Jedi, he was brought to life both as a puppet and a costumed actor during the film. Nunb was puppeteered by Mike Quinn and was portrayed by Richard Bonehill in wide shots. The character was voiced by Kipsang Rotich, a Kenyan student who spoke in his native Kalenjin, as well as in Kikuyu. Quinn and Rotich both returned for the role in the sequel trilogy, namely Star Wars: The Force Awakens (2015), Star Wars: The Last Jedi (2017), and Star Wars: The Rise of Skywalker (2019).

Within the fictional Star Wars universe, Nien Nunb is an arms dealer of the Sullustan species who joins the Rebel Alliance in fighting the evil Galactic Empire. His most notable feat is co-piloting the Millennium Falcon alongside Lando Calrissian during the Battle of Endor, where he helps to destroy the second Death Star. Three decades later, Nunb is a starfighter pilot in the Resistance and helps in the fight against the First Order, including the Battles of Starkiller Base, Crait, and Exegol, being killed during the latter.

In the years since Return of the Jedi's release, the character went on to become a fan-favorite, and has made appearances in various works within the Star Wars Expanded Universe.

Creation and portrayal
Nunb's name originated from the fact that he was referred to as "Number Nine" on creature packaging. In an interview, Richard Marquand described Nien Nunb as, "…a Muppet, a guy under the deck does his thing. He's got some dialogue to do. He's got this funny, twitchy face. He's a terrific character in my mind".

Nien Nunb was brought to life by both a puppeteer and as a costumed-actor during the film. Initially, he was just to appear in the briefing room scenes, and the Endor celebration. For these appearances he was portrayed by stuntman Richard Bonehill, in costume and mask. However, Nunb was later chosen, by series creator George Lucas, to appear in the Millennium Falcon, as Lando Calrissian's co-pilot. Since the character now had dialogue, it was decided that the mask would be reworked into a puppet, with mechanisms to allow for moving lips and eyes. For these scenes, in the cockpit, the role was handed over to puppeteer Mike Quinn.

The character was voiced by Bill Kipsang Rotich, a Kenyan student and native Kalenjin speaker, who spoke in Kikuyu and Haya for the role. After voicing the character, Rotich became a local celebrity in his home country, as many Kenyan viewers could hear their own languages in a Star Wars film, and understand the character's dialogue.

Quinn returned to the role for The Force Awakens, without Bonehill, who died in February 2015. Rotich was also tracked down in his native Kenya, by actor Christian Simpson, to voice the character again.

Appearances

Films

Return of the Jedi (1983)
Nunb is introduced as a member of the Alliance Fleet, selected to fly as co-pilot to General Lando Calrissian (Billy Dee Williams) aboard the Millennium Falcon during the Battle of Endor, where they lead the assault to destroy the second Death Star. Before the battle, when the Alliance Fleet gathers near Sullust, Nunb expresses concern about the plan of attack and whether General Han Solo (Harrison Ford), Princess Leia Organa (Carrie Fisher), and their team would be able to successfully destroy the Death Star's shield generator on the moon of Endor before the fleet arrived. Calrissian assures him that Solo would have the shield down on schedule.

With Nunb and Calrissian in the cockpit of the Millennium Falcon leading the attack, the Alliance Fleet arrives over Endor to find that the shield generator is still operational, quickly realizing that the battle is a trap set by Emperor Palpatine (Ian McDiarmid) to engage and destroy the Rebel Alliance once and for all. The fleet remains over Endor and engages Imperial forces in the hopes that Solo and his team would still be able to complete their mission and destroy the generator. The fleet keeps to fighting Imperial TIE fighters and Star Destroyers, particularly once they learn that the Death Star is operational. Once Solo's team destroys the shield generator, the Millennium Falcon enters the Death Star's superstructure and fires the shot that begins a chain reaction that destroys the battle station. Nunb and Calrissian escape the Death Star just before it is consumed in a massive explosion. Nunb joins his fellow Rebels and the native Ewoks on the surface of Endor in celebrating the destruction of the second Death Star and the downfall of the Empire.

The Force Awakens (2015)
Mike Quinn confirmed on October 19, 2015 via Facebook that he would return in Star Wars: The Force Awakens as Nien Nunb. Later on December 6, the character's appearance was seen in a TV spot for the film. Kipsang Rotich also reprised his role as the voice for Nien Nunb, having been tracked down by actor Christian Simpson.

In the film, when the First Order destroys the Hosnian system with the Starkiller Base superweapon, the Resistance base on D'Qar becomes the next target. Quickly establishing a plan to destroy Starkiller Base, Nunb, along with the rest of the Starfighter Corps, flies to the planet in an attempt to destroy its thermal oscillator and disable the weapon. During the battle, many Resistance pilots are killed before the oscillator is destroyed by Poe Dameron (Oscar Isaac). Nunb is one of seven surviving X-wing pilots, and he celebrates with the rest of the Resistance upon returning to D'Qar.

The Last Jedi (2017)
Mike Quinn reprised his role as Nien Nunb in Star Wars: The Last Jedi, the second installment of the sequel trilogy. Kipsang Rotich, on the other hand, did not, because the character doesn't have any lines in this film.

In the film, Nien Nunb evacuates alongside his fellow soldiers from the Resistance base of D'Qar, and is present aboard the MC85 Star Cruiser Raddus during the battle of the Resistance's bombers against the First Order. Nunb later escapes offscreen alongside Leia and other Resistance members to the old Rebellion base on the planet of Crait. On Crait, Nien pilots a ski speeder along with Poe Dameron, rogue stormtrooper Finn (John Boyega), Resistance mechanic Rose Tico (Kelly Marie Tran) and X-wing pilot C'ai Threnalli. He (along with Poe, Threnalli and Tico) has to bail out as the superlaser siege cannon, which they were trying to destroy, becomes too powerful. Nunb is seen at the end of the film talking with Finn as the remaining members of the Resistance escape from the clutches of the First Order once more.

The Rise of Skywalker (2019)
Kipsang Rotich returned as Nien Nunb for the first time since The Force Awakens, and Mike Quinn returned as his puppeteer.

Over one year since the last fight with the First Order, Nien Nunb follows the Resistance to relocate to Ajan Kloss, where they discuss how they are going to defeat the resurrected Emperor Palpatine (Ian McDiarmid) and the Sith Eternal. Minutes before take-off, as the Resistance plan their final offensive, Nunb suggests to the Resistance that there aren't enough of them to defeat the Sith Eternal forces, including the Final Order. Poe persuades him and all of the Resistance that that is what the Emperor wants them to think - but it is not true. During the climatic final Battle on Exegol, Nunb flies the Tantive IV, Leia's personal craft. He loses control of the ship when the Sith Lord uses Force lightning to disable all of the Resistance ships in an attempt to stop them from destroying the Sith fleet. While Nunb's fate is left ambiguous in the film, its novelization confirms that the crew of the Tantive IV, including Nunb, are among those killed by Palpatine.

Comics

Princess Leia (2015)
In the comic Star Wars: Princess Leia (2015), which is set shortly after the end of Star Wars Episode IV: A New Hope, Nunb helps Leia with a mission to unite the few survivors of the destruction of Alderaan. On his native planet,  Sullust, Nunb helps Leia smuggle the Alderaanians away from the Empire. He also provides the arms in his ship to Leia and her people, to use against the Empire. Leia presents him with a necklace that once belonged to her adoptive mother, Queen Breha Organa of Alderaan, as a token of her gratitude.

Later in the mission, Leia turns herself over to Imperial Commander Dreed on the desert world of Skaradosh in exchange for the release of Tula, an Imperial officer from Alderaan; Tula's sister, Tace, is part of Leia's group of refugees and Tula secretly manipulates her sister for information about Leia's whereabouts. Before she can be taken captive, the Mellcrawler arrives to rescue her, with Nunb having slipped the ship onto the planet without the orbiting Imperial forces noticing. Leia thanks Nunb for his efforts, but he says that the real test would be making it past the Imperial forces alive. Nunb launches a decoy to fool the Imperial vessels, leaving them to follow the sensor decoy as the Mellcrawler avoids their detection. The trick is successful and the Star Destroyer crew believes the Mellcrawler has been destroyed, and Leia with it. At that moment, a fleet of Alderaanians from Espirion arrive to assist Leia. The arrival of the fleet allows the Alderaanians to destroy the Star Destroyer, and the Alderaanian fleet escapes the wrath of the Empire. Nunb later attends a celebration to celebrate the success of the mission to unite them.

Video games
Nien Nunb appears as a playable Hero character in the Outer Rim expansion pack for the video game Star Wars Battlefront (2015). He is a "Unique" unit in the 2017 free-to-play mobile game Star Wars Force Arena by Netmarble. He is partnered with Lando Calrissian. He also appears as a playable character in Lego Star Wars: The Force Awakens and Lego Star Wars: The Skywalker Saga.

Misc
Nein Nunb also appears in the 2019 attraction “Star Wars: Rise of The Resistance” and in "Star Wars: Galaxy’s Edge" at Disneyland and Walt Disney World Resort respectively.

References

External links

Characters created by George Lucas
Fictional space pilots
Film characters introduced in 1983
Fictional fighter pilots
Fictional humanoids
Fictional military personnel in films
Fictional revolutionaries
Fictional smugglers
Fictional war veterans
Male characters in film
Star Wars puppets
Star Wars Skywalker Saga characters